Mjoberg's toadlet (Uperoleia mjobergii) is a species of frog in the family Myobatrachidae.  It is endemic to Australia.  Its natural habitats are subtropical or tropical dry shrubland and subtropical or tropical dry lowland grassland.  It is named for Swedish zoologist Eric Mjöberg.

References

Uperoleia
Amphibians of Western Australia
Taxonomy articles created by Polbot
Amphibians described in 1913
Frogs of Australia